The 1909 County Championship was the 20th officially organised running of the County Championship. The season ran from 3 May to 30 August 1909. Kent won their second championship title, while Lancashire finished in second place. The previous season's winners, Yorkshire, finished third.

Table

 One point was awarded for a win, and one point was taken away for each loss. Final placings were decided by dividing the number of points earned by the number of completed matches (i.e. those that ended in a win or a loss), and multiplying by 100.

Statistics

Batting

Bowling

See also
 1909 English cricket season
 Derbyshire County Cricket Club in 1909
 Kent County Cricket Club in 1909

References

1909 in English cricket
County Championship seasons
County